The 2017 North Dakota Fighting Hawks football team represented the University of North Dakota during the 2017 NCAA Division I FCS football season. They were led by fourth-year head coach Bubba Schweigert and played their home games at the Alerus Center. The Fighting Hawks were a member of the Big Sky Conference. They finished the season 3–8, 2–6 in Big Sky play to finish in a three-way tie for 9th place.

This was North Dakota's final year as a full member of the Big Sky. While most of the school's athletic programs will move to the Summit League in 2018, the football program will be classified as an FCS independent in 2018 and 2019 before joining the Missouri Valley Football Conference in 2020. Their games against Big Sky members will still count in the Big Sky standings but they will be ineligible for the Big Sky championship.

Previous season
In 2016, North Dakota finished with a record of 9–3, 8–0 in Big Sky play, to share the conference title with Eastern Washington. They qualified for the FCS Playoffs for the first time and lost to Richmond in the second round.

Schedule

Game summaries

at Utah

Missouri State

at South Dakota

Montana State

at UC Davis

Northern Colorado

at Montana

Sacramento State

at Portland State

at Southern Utah

Eastern Washington

Ranking movements

References

North Dakota
North Dakota Fighting Hawks football seasons
North Dakota Fighting Hawks football